The Habr Awal, also contemporarily known as the Subeer Awal, and alternately romanized as the Zubeyr Awal  (Full Name:  Zubeyr ibn Abd al-Raḥmān ibn ash-Shaykh Isḥāq ibn Aḥmad) is a major clan of the wider Isaaq clan family, and is further divided into eight sub-clans of whom the two largest and most prominent are the Sa'ad Musa and Issa Musa sub-clans. Its members form a part of the Habr Magaadle confederation. The Habr Awal traditionally consists of nomadic pastoralists, coastal people, merchants and farmers. They are historically viewed as an affluent clan relative to other Somali clans. The Habr Awal are politically and economically influential in present-day Somaliland, and reside in strategic coastal and fertile lands.

Distribution

The Habr Awal clan make up the majority in Maroodi Jeex region which is considered the most populous region in Somaliland, forming a majority in the national capital Hargeisa as well as exclusively dominating in the agricultural towns and settlements of Gabiley, Wajaale, Arabsiyo, and Kalabaydh. The Habr Awal are also prevalent in Sahil region, principally in the regional capital and port city of Berbera, and the historic town of Sheikh as well as Daarbuduq. The clan also partially inhabits the northern portion of the capital city of Burao in Togdheer region as well. The Habr Awal also partially inhabit the neighbouring region of Awdal, namely in eastern Lughaya. Outside of Somaliland, the Habr Awal also have large settlements in the Somali Region of Ethiopia, specifically in Fafan Zone where they respectively make up the majority in Harshin, Hart Sheik, and Wajaale (Ethiopian Side) towns. They also settle and border Kebri Beyah and Jigjiga in the Fafan Zone. They also have a large settlement in Kenya where they are known as a constituent segment of the Isahakia community. Finally they have a large presence in Djibouti as well, forming a large percentage of the Somali population in Djibouti and within Djibouti they have historically settled in Quartier 3, which is one of the 7 major districts in Djibouti.

History

Lineage

Sheikh Ishaaq ibn Ahmed was one of the Arabian scholars that crossed the sea from Arabia to the Horn of Africa to spread Islam around 12th to 13th century. He is said to have been descended from Prophet Mohammed's daughter Fatimah. Hence the Sheikh belonged to the Ashraf or Sada, titles given to the descendants of the prophet. He married two local women in Somaliland that left him eight sons, one of them being Abdulrahman (Awal). The descendants of those eight sons constitute the Isaaq clan-family.

The grave of Zubeyr Awal, the eponymous ancestor of the Habr Awal subclan of the Isaaq, is located in Jidali in Sanaag which is about 100 km east of the tomb of his grandfather Sheikh Ishaaq bin Ahmed, the founding father of the Isaaq clan, whose tomb is located in the coastal town of Maydh.

Medieval Period (Conquest of Abbysinia)
Historically the Habr Awal were part of the Adal Sultanate and are mentioned in the renowned "Futuh Al-Habash" for their major contributions in the Ethiopian-Adal war as the Habr Magaadle along with the Garhajis, Arap and Ayub clans against the Ethiopian Empire, and also for producing a historical figure known as Ahmad Girri bin Husain who was the righthand partner of Ahmad ibn Ibrahim al-Ghazi and a chieftain for the Habr Magaadle forces during the Ethiopian–Adal war.

Sa'ad Musa

The Habr Awal have a rich mercantile history largely due to their possession of the major Somali port of Berbera, which was the chief port and settlement of Habr Awal clan during the early modern period. The clan had strong ties to the Emirate of Harar and Emirs would hold Habr Awal merchants in their court with high esteem with Richard Burton noting their influence in Emir Ahmad III ibn Abu Bakr's court and discussions with the Vizier Mohammed.
The Habr Awal as a whole are a rich people, mainly thanks to the trade passing through the port of Berbera which lies in the territory of the Sa’ad Musa.
In this way the tribes occupying the tract of country through which the main caravan or trade routes passed accumulated a good deal of wealth, while those like the Ayal Ahmed, fortunate enough to possess a port so favored by Nature as Berbera, naturally soon became rich.

The Habr Awal merchants had extensive trade relations with Arab and Indian merchants from Arabia and the Indian subcontinent respectively. When these foreign traders arrived in Berbera and Bulhar to conduct trade, there was a mutually beneficial arrangement based on the abban (protection) system between them and the local Reer Yunis Nuh (Ayyal Yunis) and Ahmed Nuh (Ayyal Ahmed) lineages of Sa’ad Musa, Habr Awal:

Before this, and prior to the British settlement at Aden in 1839, the Ayyal Yunis and Ayyal Ahmed lineages of the Habr Awal clan had held Berbera and jointly managed its trade, sharing in the profits on all commercial transactions as ‘protectors’ (abans) of foreign merchants from Arabia and India. When under the stimulus of developments at Aden the port's prosperity markedly increased, the numerically dominant Ayyal Yunis drove out their rival kinsmen and declared themselves commercial masters of Berbera. This led to a feud in which each side sought outside help; the defeated Ayyal Ahmed turned to Haji Shirmarke ‘Ali and his Habr Yunis clansmen for support. With this backing, they were then able to re-establish themselves and to expel the Ayyal Yunis who moved to the small roadstead of Bulhar, some miles to the west of Berbera.

Not only did the Habr Awal host foreign merchants at their ports, they also conducted trade missions on their own vessels to the Arabian ports. The majority of the Somali merchants who frequented Aden and other Southern Arabian ports hailed from the Habr Awal clan. They procured various raw goods from Harar and the interior in exchange for manufactured goods. During their stay, the Habr Awal rented their own houses and hired their own servants, whereas other Somali clans tended to stay with relatives already established across the Gulf.

Merchants. — These are generally members of the Habr Awal tribe. They bring from Harrar and the Galla country, coffee, saffron (bastard), tusks (ivory), and feathers, taking away in return zinc, brass, broad cloth, and piece goods. They remain in Aden for about twenty days at a time during the trading season, which lasts about nine months,' making four trips. During their residence they hire a house, and are accompanied by their own domestics.

In the interior, Habr Awal trade caravans (khafilas) were a frequent sight according to contemporary European accounts of the Somali Peninsula:

On leaving Hargeisa we travelled for many miles through beautiful park-like land, alive with birds and jungle fowl. We met the usual Somali khafilas [trading caravans] of Habr-Awal men, carrying their skins, gums, ghee, and coffee to our port at Bulhar, situated between Berbera and Zeila.

The Somalis from the deep interior, principally those from the Ogaden, also gained most of their resources from the Habr Awal merchants who they called "iidoor", an enviable pejorative meaning merchant or trader, a reference to the mercantile nature of the Habr Awal traders at the time. The coastal Habr Awal (mainly the Reer Ahmed Nuh) regularly acted as brokers/middlemen for the Somali clans of the interior who wished to take their goods to the ports of Berbera and Bulhar:

The custom is for the Ayal Achmet (Berbera tribe) to act as brokers, and too often most of the profits stick to the hands of the middleman. Till lately no Ogadayn ever went to the coast, but entrusted the goods to coast traders.

Battle of Berbera 

When a British vessel named the Mary Anne attempted to dock in Berbera's port in 1825 it was attacked and multiple members of the crew were massacred by the Habr Awal. In response the Royal Navy enforced a blockade and some accounts narrate a bombardment of the city. In 1827 two years later the British arrived and extended an offer to relieve the blockade which had halted Berbera's lucrative trade in exchange for indemnity. Following this initial suggestion the Battle of Berbera 1827 would break out. After the Habr Awal defeat, 15,000 Spanish dollars was to be paid by the Habr Awal leaders for the destruction of the ship and loss of life.
The Isaaq Sultan Farah Guled and Haji Ali penned a letter to Sultan bin Saqr Al Qasimi of Ras Al Khaimah requesting military assistance and joint religious war against the British.
This would not materialize as Sultan Saqr was incapacitated by prior Persian Gulf campaign of 1819 and was unable to send aid to Berbera. Alongside their stronghold in the Persian Gulf & Gulf of Oman the Qasimi were very active both militarily and economically in the Gulf of Aden and were given to plunder and attack ships as far west as the Mocha on the Red Sea. They had numerous commercial ties with the Somalis, leading vessels from Ras Al Khaimah and the Persian Gulf to regularly attend trade fairs in the large ports of Berbera and Zeila and were very familiar with the Isaaq.

Consequently, The Habr Awal clan signed a protectorate treaty with the British Empire on 14 July 1884. The Habr Awal continued to have a lucrative trading agreement with their foreign contacts, many of whom were also under British rule in their respective nations. The British established the capital of the British Somaliland protectorate at Berbera, but later moved the capital to Hargeisa in 1941.

Garaads and Sultans of the Habr Awal
The Habr Awal have a long tradition of leadership and are led by a Sultan from the Ahmed Abdalla branch - a numerous subclan of Saad Musa that mainly reside in Ethiopia. Historically preferring to use the native term Garaad like the Warsangeli, both clans have since changed the name of the title to Suldaan although the role is identical. Habr Awal Garaads would rally men in times of war and settle large disputes with other clans filling the role as the ultimate peacemaker (nabadoon). The first Garaad Biniin was crowned around a similar time as the first Habr Yunis Sultan Diriiye Ainasha, with both of these large subclans breaking from the tutelage of the Eidagale who were the wider leaders of the Isaaq Sultanate. Following his death, the Habr Awal did not crown a new Garaad for several years as Biniin's heirs were too young, with Garaad Abdalla being crowned when he came of age. Fighting in the southern limits of Habr Awal territory to protect the clan against its enemies and fighting off raids. In one incident he narrowly avoided a Jidwaaq surprise attack with the Ahmed Abdalla rallying quickly and forcing the raiders to flee. 

Garaad Abdalla served for several decades and was received by travelling British officials near the southern limit of the protectorate in 1894 concerning expansion by General Ras Makonen on behalf of Menelik II. Garaad Abdalla alongside many other leaders in British Somaliland such as Sultan Deria Hassan and Sheikh Madar were worried about a devastating raid by the Abyssinian forces aimed at the burgeoning town Hargeisa and its environs. The Garaad was contacted by Makonen just two years later asking him and the Habr Awal to join the Ethiopian Empire but was rebuffed. Garaad Abdalla was approached by the Sultan of Habr Yunis when they had faced a drought, the Habr Yunis requested access to Habr Awal wells to water. Abdalla granted the request but some members of his clan thought he was too generous and helping the Habr Yunis at the expense of the wellbeing of their own stock. Chief amongst these people was his 15 year old Askar. When some of the Habr Yunis party came to water, Askar stepped in between the well and the men barring them access. He was reprimanded for his foolishness and told to step aside and obey his father's wishes. Enraged Askar stabbed the man who reprimanded him and war almost broke out at this action.

A wise Habr Awal bard from Bulhar named Aami stood and recited a gabay
The words too many have already been spoken about Yunis' foolish words
But righteous judgement pious to you according to ancient custom, bringing peace and (firmly) like a mountain
Very close to you lurk people, you enemies, from primeval times their commemorating a feud
If the time came when you were blinded by the quarrel, you would not respect it
Without hesitation, they suddenly fell upon you
All hostile tribes have heard the news of your quarrel
Like vultures, they all look greedily at your flesh!

The parties were moved by his words and mediated their dispute. Garaad Abdalla gave the hand of one of his daughters to the poet as a reward for his efforts. Following Abdalla's death, his eldest son Askar succeeded him as Garaad. Askar was a skilled horseman and fought in offensive with the southern sections of the clan against the Dervish who had begun raiding Habr Awal and other clans in the region. Sheikh Madar rallied the northern sections of the Habr Awal who unlike the Ahmed Abdalla and a few others, did reside mainly inside the borders of British Somaliland. Following Askaar's death his younger brother Diriiye took the mantle of Garaad and unlike his brother and father was more focused on the concerns of the Habr Awal community as a period of relative peace had set in following the defeat of the Dervishes, decreasing the need for fighting. Diriiye was faced with a parallel challenger to his role as Garaad and the Habr Awal rallied behind him and rebuffed the pretender.

Contemporary Era

Migration South from the Coast to the Interior

In the mid 19th century Hargeisa and the surrounding region was a hotbed of clan strife with raids being made on caravans attempting to pass through. Madar alongside other Sufi sheikhs established the Jama'a Weyn or the big congregation in Hargeisa. The new congregation adhered to the 900 year old Qadiriyya order established by renowned Shaykh Abdul Qadir Gilani and introduced new practices that would put Hargeisa on the trajectory to becoming the largest Somali city in Somaliland and the second largest Somali inhabited city to date. Hargeisa and its environs had suitable soil and ample water supply for agriculture yet the pastoralists had not been taking advantage of this fact. Madar alongside the other leaders of Jam'a Weyn introduced the cultivation of sorghum and the new construction of permanent housing and creating his grand mosque in 1883. The Sheikh was also responsible for leading the communal prayers supplicating to Allah for rain in a ritual known as roobdoon.  Sheikh Madar and Isaaq Sultan Deria Hassan met outside Hargeisa in 1870 to discuss issues regarding the new town and agreed that poaching and tree cutting in the vicinity should be banned. The Saad Musa branch of the Habr Awal began to settle in Hargeisa under the watch of Madar and the Sultan Deria and eagerly took up the new farming methods.

The Jama'a formed a nucleus that attracted other pastoralists to come and settle in the burgeoning town. As well, clan conflicts were mitigated as the new community had managed to unify on a shared religious identity rather than aligning strictly on traditional clan basis. With the Sheikh succeeding in the task delegated to him by his master Sheikh Kabir. Religious leaders in the Jama'a took it upon themselves to place the disabled in the region under their care.

Lobbying for British Somaliland Independence
In the year 1955, Sultan Abdulrahman Garad Deria was a member of a 4 delegation team of politicians and Sultans to London, United Kingdom. Their goal was to petition and pressure the British Government in returning lost treaty territory known as the 'Haud Reserve Area' ceded to Ethiopian Empire during the Anglo Ethiopian treaty of 1954.

In Imperial Policies and Nationalism in The Decolonization of Somaliland, 1954-1960, Historian Jama Mohamed writes:
The N.U.F. campaigned for the return of the territories both in Somaliland and abroad. In March 1955, for instance, a delegation consisting of Michael Mariano, Abokor Haji Farah and Abdi Dahir went to Mogadisho to win the support and co-operation of the nationalist groups in Somalia. And in February and May 1955 another delegation consisting of two traditional Sultans (Sultan Abdillahi Sultan Deria, and Suldaan Abdulrahman Gaarad Deria), and two Western-educated moderate politicians (Michael Mariano, Abdirahman Ali Mohamed Dubeh) visited London and New York. During their tour of London, they formally met and discussed the issue with the Secretary of State for the Colonies, Alan Lennox-Boyd. They told Lennox-Boyd about the 1885 Anglo-Somali treaties. Under the agreements, Michael Mariano stated, the British Government 'undertook never to cede, sell, mortgage or otherwise give for occupation, save to the British Government, any portion of the territory inhabited by them or being under their control'. But now the Somali people 'have heard that their land was being given to Ethiopia under an Anglo-Ethiopian Treaty of 1897'. That treaty, however, was 'in conflict' with the Anglo-Somali treaties 'which took precedence in time' over the 1897 Anglo-Ethiopian Treaty[.] The British Government had 'exceeded its powers when it concluded the 1897 Treaty and ... the 1897 Treaty was not binding on the tribes.' Sultan Abdillahi also added that the 1954 agreement was a 'great shock to the Somali people' since they had not been told about the negotiations, and since the British Government had been administering the area since 1941. The delegates requested, as Sultan Abdulrahman put it, the postponement of the implementation of the agreement to 'grant the delegation time to put up their case' in Parliament and in international organizations.

Issa Musa

Historically, the Isa Musa made use of the very valuable caravan trade in the Horn of Africa. Deriving income from arriving caravans into the markets of the coastal city of Berbera.

According to the account of Bricchetti, the Isa Musa were able to attain revenue thanks to the busy caravan traffic entering & leaving the coastal and historical city of BerberaThey pass for skilled camel breeders and intelligent caravan organizers [Ayal Achmed]. And such are also the different families of the Isa Musa, who live off the caravan traffic with the Ogaden, going up to Uebi [Webi] along the Faf (Fafan) route.

Establishment of Issa Musa Sultanate
With Diriiye's eventual death, his son Abdulrahman was crowned and the first Habr Awal leader to style himself as 'Sultan' rather than Garaad. Abdulrahman was very much like his father however was much more active in protectorate affairs. When the Eidagale attempted to raid the Issa Musa, a son of the Habr Yunis Sultan joined the raid and when the raiders were pursued he was killed. The Sultan of the Habr Yunis approached Abdulrahman to resolve the dispute and wanted him to compel the Issa Musa to pay mag for the Sultan's son. According to traditional Somali xeer restitution is not paid when one is killed in self defense. So the Issa Musa refused and banged their shields in disproval of Abdulrahman's judgement.

Cismaan Haariyey a poet stood and recited the following geeraar reaffirming his respect but disagreeing with Sultan Abdulrahman. After this the Issa Musa would leave and go on to crown their first Sultan, Sultan Koshin in 1949 marking their independence from their larger Saad Musa brethren.

Contemporary Era

The Issa Musse have produced many prominent Somali figures with the Undersecretary General of the United Nations Abdulrahim Abby Farah, and most prominently the first Somali Prime Minister & second President of Somaliland Muhammad Haji Ibrahim Egal, who led the former British Somaliland protectorate to independence in July 1960 to form the Somali Republic. To date, Egal has been the only Isaaq Prime Minister of Somalia.

On 26 June 1960 Egal was Prime minister of the newly independent State of Somaliland, which merged five days later with the former Trust Territory of Somalia to form the Somali Republic on July 1, 1960.

Most prominently, Somaliland's political institutions were essentially from the ground up under the consequential rule of Egal . During his 9-year tenure as President of Somaliland, Egal managed to disarm local rebel groups, stabilized the northwestern Somaliland region's economy, and established informal trade ties with foreign countries. He also introduced the Somaliland shilling, passport and a newly redesigned flag. In addition, Egal created the Somaliland Armed Forces, the most effective Somali armed forces since the disbandment of the Somali National Army in 1991.

Somali Civil War and the Somali National Movement

The Somali National Movement (SNM) was a 1980s–1990s rebel group. The SNM at 1981 founding in London it elected Ahmed Mohamed Gulaid from the Habr Awal clan as its first chairman, who stated that the group's explicit purpose was to overthrow the Siad Barre military regime. The SNM gathered its main base of support from members of the Isaaq clan, who formed and supported the movement in response to years of systematic discrimination by the Siad Barre government.

As commander of the 99th division, General Mohamed Hasan Abdullahi (Jidhif) also established a Somali National Movement military base in Zeila where the SNM occupied the Awdal region for 4 years and successfully defeated attempts by USF militia forces loyal to Djibouti who tried to take advantage of the fall of Siad Barre's Military Junta in 1991 and annex the city of Zeila.

List of prominent Habr Awal SNM Commanders (Mujahids).

 Colonel Abdilahi Askar Barkhad
 Abdikarim Hashi Elmi
 Adan Dhamah
 Adan Shiine
 Ahmed Jama Sabban (Janan Oogo)
 Ahmed Mohamed Gulaid
 Ahmed Dhagah
 Ahmed Ibrahim (Raage Bidaar)
 Ahmed Golhaye
 Ahmed Mohamed Hasan (Ahmed Japan)
 Ali Gurey
 General Ali Hussein Abdi
 Boobe Yusuf Dualeh
 General Hassan Yonis Habane
 Haybe Ahmed Gure (Haybe Laambad)
 Hamud Ibrahim Ismail
 Professor Ibrahim Meygaag Samatar
 Ibrahim Dhagahweyne
 Sheikh Ibrahim Madar 
 Mohamed Elmi Samatar Galan
 General Mohamed Hasan Abdullahi (Jidhif)
 Mohamed Hashi Elmi
 Mohamed Hasan (Gacmo Dheere)
 Mahdi Ali Farah
 Colonel Muse Bihi Abdi
 Sheikh Yusuf Ali Sheikh Madar
 Yahya Haji Ibrahim

Clan Tree and Lineage

In the Isaaq clan-family, component clans are divided into two uterine divisions, as shown in the genealogy. The first division is between those lineages descended from sons of Sheikh Ishaaq by a Harari woman – the Habr Habuusheed – and those descended from sons of Sheikh Ishaaq by a Somali woman of the Magaadle sub-clan of the Dir – the Habr Magaadle. Indeed, most of the largest clans of the clan-family are in fact uterine alliances hence the matronymic "Habr" which in archaic Somali means "mother". This is illustrated in the following clan structure. DNA analysis of Habr Awal clan members inhabiting Djibouti found that all of the individuals belonged to the EV32 subclade of the Y-DNA E1b1b paternal haplogroup.

A summarized clan family tree of major Habr Awal subclans is presented below.

Sheikh Ishaaq Bin Ahmed Al Hashimi (Sheikh Ishaaq)
 Habr Habuusheed
  Ahmed (Tol-Ja’lo) 
  Muuse (Habr Jeclo)
  Ibrahiim (Sanbuur)
  Muhammad (‘Ibraan)
 Habr Magaadle
  Ismail (Garhajis) 
  Ayub
  Muhammad (Arap)
 Abdirahman (Habr Awal)
Sa'ad Muuse
Abdirahman Sa'ad
Abdalla Sa'ad
Hassan Sa'ad
Abdalla Hassan
Isaaq Sa'ad
Makahil 
Nux Makahil
Abokor Makahil
Cumar Makahil
Mohammed Makahil
Hassan Makahil
Ali Hassan
Jibril Hassan
Rooble Hassan
Osman Hassan
Mohammed Isaaq (Abbas)
Isse Isaaq (Ciise Carab)
Musa (Ase) Isaaq
Yeesif Isaaq
Abokor Isaaq
Ugaadh Abokor (Ugaadhyahan)
Abdalla Abokor
Hussein Abokor
Osman Hussein (Cismaannada)
Jibril Hussein
Ismail Jibril 
Nuh Ismail
Yunis Nuh (Reer Yunis Nuh)
Shirdoon Yonis (Reer Shirdoon)
Hoosh Yonis (Reer Hoosh)
Gadid Yonis (Reer Gadid)
Mohammed Yonis
Ahmed Nuh (Reer Ahmed Nuh)
Said Ismail
Abdalla Said
Samatar Abdalla (Reer Samatar)
Abane Abdalla (Reer Abane)
Ahmed Abdalla (Reer Ahmed Abdalla); The Sultan of Habr Awal's Royal Lineage
Abdalla Ismail
Ali Ismail
Idris Ismail (Bah Gobo)
Muhumed Ismail (Waran'ad)
Yonis Ismail (Bah Gobo)
Yusuf Ismail
Jibril Abokor 
Adan Jibril (Bahaabar Adan)
Ali Jibril
Omar Ali
Abeeb Omar (Baha Omar)
Abtidon Omar (Baha Omar)
Adan Omar 
Hussein Qawa Omar (Baha Omar)
Sahal Omar (Baha Omar)
Yonis Omar (Dugeh) 
Ismail Omar
Barre Ismail
Hareed Barre (Reer Hareed)
Dalal Ismail (Reer Dalal)
Geedi Ismail 'Gheedi Shide' (Baha Omar) 
Hoosh Ismail (Baha Omar)
Higgis Ismail 
Idris Ismail 
Ollow Ismail 
Samatar Ismail 
Qayaad Ismail (Baha Omar)
Hassan Jibril
Mohamed Jibril (Deriyahan) 
Yonis Jibril (Reer Yonis)
Muuse Yonis
Cabdi Muse Yonis
Caraale yonis
Caynaashe Yonis
Urkurag Yonis
Adan Urkurag
Omar Adan
Ali Adan
Ahmed Adan
Issa Muuse
Adan Issa
Jibril Adan
Mohamoud Jibril
Hassan Jibril
Ibrahim Jibril
Ismail Jibril
Abokor Issa
Hassan Abokor
Balle Hassan (Reer Baale)
Musa Hassan
Idarys Issa
Mohamed Issa
Mukhtar Mohamed
Hassan Mohamed 
Jibril Mohamed 
Omar Jibril
Abokor Jibril
Yonis Jibril
Muuse Jibril
Ali Muuse 
Sahal Ali (Reer Sahal)
Wa'ays Ali (Reer Wa'ays)
Abane Ali (Reer Abane)
Had Ali  (Reer Had)
Hildid Ali  (Reer Hildid)
Abdirahman Muuse
Abdulle Muuse 
Abdalle Abdulle (Abdalle Qoyan)
Hassan Abdulle 
Ahmed Hassan (Dhogori)
Deriyahan Hassan
Abdalla Muuse
Afgab Muuse(Abdi Muse)
Egalle Muuse
Eli Muuse
Omar Muuse

Prominent and Influential figures

The clan has produced some of the most prominent and influential Somali figures in history, who are listed below:

 Abdillahi Suldaan Mohammed Timacade, known as "Timacade", a famous poet during the pre- and post-colonial periods
Suldaan Abdulrahman Gaarad Deria, 1st Sultan & 5th leader of the Habr Awal
 Sheikh Madar Ahmed Shirwac, credited with the early growth of and as the founding father of modern Hargeisa
Sheikh Ibrahim Sheikh Yusuf Sheikh Madar, served as the elected chairman of the SNM in January 1982 and later served as the Guurti leader in the Somaliland Parliament. He is the grandson of the famous Sheikh Madar.
 Abdulrahim Abby Farah, Under-Secretary-General of the United Nations 1979–1990 and Permanent Representative of Somali Republic to the United Nations 1965–1972.
 Abdurrahman Mahmoud Aidiid, the former Mayor of Hargeisa, the capital of the Republic of Somaliland.
 Abdishakur Iddin, the current Mayor of Berbera, the capital of Sahil Region.
 Abdul Majid Hussein, Economist, Former Permanent Representative of Ethiopia to the United Nations, 2001–2004. Leader of Ethiopian Somali Democratic League (ESDL) party in the Somali Region of Ethiopia from 1995 to 2001.
 Ahmed Mohamed Gulaid, one of the founding members of the Somali National Movement and the first to be elected as the chairman of the organization in October 1981.
 Ahmad Girri bin Husain, Advisor to Ahmad ibn Ibrahim al-Ghazi (Ahmed Guray) and a high ranking Adal Sultanate general who led a large army against the Abyssinian empire.
 Ahmed Hassan Awke, Legendary Somali journalist and broadcaster. He was a veteran of the BBC World Service, the Voice of America, Somaliland National TV, Horn Cable Television, Radio Mogadishu and Universal TV among also being the presidential spokesman of Siad Barre during his Military Junta.
 Ahmed Yusuf Yasin, the Vice-President of Somaliland from 2002 until 2010, and The Second Chairman of UDUB party.
 Ali Abdi Farah, Former Minister of Communication and Culture in Djibouti
 Ali Feiruz, celebrated Somali musician in Djibouti and Somaliland
 Gaarriye (born Mohamed Hashi Dhama), Famous poet who composed one of the best known Somali language poems on the theme of reconciliation, "Hagarlaawe" (The Charitable).
 Jaamac Yusuf Tamiinlaaye, mentioned in the Geoffrey Archer's 1916 important members of Darawiish haroun list
 Hussain Bisad, one of the tallest men in the world, at 2.32 m (7 ft 7 1⁄2 in). He has the largest hand span of anyone alive.
 Ibrahim Dheere, Considered to be the first Somali billionaire and richest Somali person in the world with an estimated net worth of 1.8 billion US Dollars.
 Ismail Ahmed, owner and CEO of WorldRemit which is one of the fastest growing money transfer company in the world and he's considered 7th most influential man in Britain. 
 Muhammad Haji Ibrahim Egal, Legendary Somali politician. First Prime Minister of Somalia: 1960, 1967–1969. President of Somaliland, 1993–2002.
 Mohammed Abdillahi Kahin 'Ogsadey', A Somali business tycoon based in Ethiopia, where he established MAO Harar Horse, the first African corporation to export coffee and amassed a net worth of approximately $3 Billion Ethiopian Birr.
 Mohamed Abdullahi Omaar, former Foreign Minister of Somalia
 Mohamed Hasan Abdullahi, former Chief of Staff of Somaliland Armed Forces
 Mo Farah, British four-time Olympic gold medalist and the most decorated athlete in British athletics history. He's also considered to be the best marathon runner in the world.
Abdi Haybe Laampad Veteran Somali comedian and one of the best Somali comedian of all time.
 Mohamed Omar Arte, former Deputy Prime Minister of Somalia.
 Muhammad Hawadle Madar, former Prime Minister of Somalia from September 3, 1990, to January 24, 1991.
 Muse Bihi Abdi, Current President of Somaliland since December 2017, and former military officer served as a Somali Air Force pilot.
 Nuh Ismail Tani, current Chief of Staff of Somaliland Armed Forces
 Rageh Omaar, Somali-British journalist and writer; former BBC world affairs correspondent;  moved to a new post at Al Jazeera English in 2006; as of 2017 is with ITV News
 Umar Arteh Ghalib, former Prime Minister of Somalia, 1991–1993; brought Somalia into the Arab League in 1974 during his term as Foreign Minister of Somalia, 1969–1977; former president of UN Security Council; teacher and poet
Dr. Saad Ali Shire, British-Somali politician, agronomist and economist, who is currently serving as the Minister of Finance of Somaliland. Shire formerly served as the Foreign Minister of Somaliland. He also served as the Minister of Planning and National Development of Somaliland.
 Sultan Osman Sultan Ali Koshin, the current Grand sultan of the Issa Musse clans.

References

Somali clans in Ethiopia
Ethnic groups in Djibouti
Society of Somaliland
Isaaq Sultanate